Marco Charpentier (born January 23, 1980) is a Canadian professional ice hockey forward, whose semi-professional rights are owned by Sorel-Tracy Éperviers in the LNAH.

Playing career
On 28 August 2009, Charpentier joined the Norwegian GET-ligaen team Lørenskog on a 2-week try-out. He made a good impression and was offered a contract. Despite ending the 2009–10-season as the third best scoring leader, behind Tomi Pöllänen and Jonas Solberg Andersen, he was not offered a new contract. General Manager, Kjell Erik Oseberg, stated that his defensive qualities were not the best (64 points and only a +9 rating).

On 17 April 2010, he was hired by the Swiss National League B team La Chaux-de-Fonds, with an option.

References

External links
 

1980 births
Living people
Baie-Comeau Drakkar players
Bridgeport Sound Tigers players
Canadian ice hockey forwards
HC La Chaux-de-Fonds players
Ice hockey people from Montreal
Lørenskog IK players
Quebec RadioX players
Toledo Storm players
Trenton Titans players
Canadian expatriate ice hockey players in Norway
Canadian expatriate ice hockey players in Switzerland